Francesco Fracanzano (1612–1656) was an Italian painter who participated in the Masaniello rebellion.

Francanzano was the brother of Cesare Fracanzano, a pupil of Spagnoletto and the master of Salvator Rosa, whose sister he had married. His married life was an unhappy one, as by the instigation of his wife he committed crimes for which he suffered death at Naples in 1656.

References

External links

Jusepe de Ribera, 1591-1652, a full text exhibition catalog from The Metropolitan Museum of Art, which includes material on Francesco Frazanzano (see index)

1612 births
1656 deaths
17th-century Italian painters
Italian male painters
Painters from Naples
People from Monopoli